USS South Dakota (SSN-790), is a nuclear powered  in service with the United States Navy. The contract to build her was awarded to Huntington Ingalls Industries in partnership with the Electric Boat division of General Dynamics in Newport News, Virginia on 22 December 2008. This boat is the seventh of the Block III submarines which will feature a revised bow, including some technology from  SSGNs. The keel laying ceremony took place on 4 April 2016. The boat's sponsor is Deanie Dempsey, wife of General Martin Dempsey. Her christening ceremony took place on 14 October 2017 in Groton, Connecticut.

References

 

Virginia-class submarines
Nuclear submarines of the United States Navy
Ships built in Groton, Connecticut
Proposed ships of the United States Navy